The Rachel Carson Center for Environment and Society (RCC) is an international, interdisciplinary
center for research and education in the environmental humanities located in Munich, Germany. It was
founded in 2009 as a joint initiative of LMU Munich (Ludwig-Maximilians-Universität München) and the Deutsches Museum, and is supported by the German Federal Ministry of Education and Research. The center is named after the American biologist, nature writer, and environmentalist, Rachel Carson.

The Rachel Carson Center's directors are Christof Mauch of LMU Munich and Helmuth Trischler of the Deutsches Museum.

Research
The Rachel Carson Center facilitates research concerning interaction between human agents and nature. Its goal is to strengthen the role of the humanities in current political and scientific debates about the environment. Generally, the center hosts a rotating group of approximately ten "Carson Fellows," post-doctoral researchers and established scholars from a variety of national and disciplinary backgrounds.

The Rachel Carson Center supports research around six thematic clusters:

 Natural Disasters and Cultures of Risk
 Resource Use and Conservation
 Ecological Imperialism
 Transformation of Landscapes
 Environmental Ethics, Politics, and Movements
 Environmental Knowledge and Knowledge Societies

Natural Disasters and Cultures of Risk

This research cluster examines how different societies have historically handled natural catastrophes. It investigates the cultural perceptions, forms of remembrance, and social as well as ecological factors which influence settlement of “risky areas.”

Resource Use and Conservation

This research investigates practices and discourses concerning natural resource use and conservation, including cultural comparisons and technical solutions.

Ecological Imperialism

This cluster explores the environmental impact of colonial and neo-colonial regimes.  This includes conservation and destruction, as well as the influence that cartography, surveying, and development planning have had on perceptions of the natural environment.

Transformation of Landscapes

Research in this cluster focuses on physical, cultural, economic, social, and political factors and consequences related to the transformation of agricultural landscapes.

Environmental Ethics, Politics, and Movements

This cluster examines ethical and political concerns such as environmental justice and sustainability. It also investigates environmental movements' origins and the social mechanisms that have contributed to their political relevance.

Environmental Knowledge and Knowledge Societies

This research concerns the role of academic scholarship in the construction and distribution of knowledge about "nature," such as the nature/culture dichotomy.

Activities
To share and discuss the work of its researchers and visitors, the RCC hosts a series of public colloquia, conferences, and workshops. The center’s outreach program also includes the development of exhibitions in collaboration with the Deutsches Museum. The Environment and Society Portal aims to make digitized environmental humanities sources and interpretive exhibitions more accessible to academics and the public at large. The Rachel Carson Center offers the doctoral program “Environment and Society” through LMU Munich.

Publications
The Rachel Carson Center is represented in print through Environment in History: International Perspectives, an English-language book series developed in collaboration with the European Society for Environmental History (ESEH) and published by Berghahn Books and through Umwelt und Gesellschaft (Environment and Society), a German-language series with Vandenhoeck & Ruprecht. In addition, the center publishes RCC Perspectives, an online series of occasional papers offering various viewpoints on the relationship between nature and culture.

References

External links
 Rachel Carson Center for Environment and Society
 Deutsches Museum
 LMU Munich
 Environment and Society Portal

Center
Research institutes in Munich
2009 establishments in Germany